This is a family tree of Roman emperors, showing only the relationships between the emperors.

27 BCE–192 CE 

The emperors from Augustus to Commodus can be organised into one large family tree.

192–235

The emperors from Pertinax to the beginning of the Crisis can be organised into one large dynasty (see Severan dynasty family tree), one smaller family and two unrelated emperors.

235–284

The emperors during the fifty-year period of the Crisis can be organised into eight families and six unrelated emperors, although no family held power for more than fifteen years.

284–518

The emperors from the founding of the Dominate in 284, in the West until 476 and in the East until 518, can be organised into one large dynasty plus various unrelated emperors. During most of this periods, though not always, there where two senior emperors ruling in separate courts. This division became permanent after the death of Theodosius I in 395.

 Western Roman Empire Eastern Roman Empire

{{Tree chart| | | | | | | | |MM| |C3| |Eu| |Hon| |Arc| |Gap|y|Cs3
 |Gap=Galla Placidia
 |Arc=Arcadius
  |boxstyle_Arc=background:#dee7fc;
 |Hon=Honorius
   |boxstyle_Hon=background:#fafad9;
 |Cs3=
  |boxstyle_Cs3=background:#fafad9;
 |Eu=Eugenius
   |boxstyle_Eu=background:#fafad9;
 |C3={{Small|Constantine IIIr.407–411}}
   |boxstyle_C3=background:#fafad9;
 |MM=

Later eastern emperors

References

Citations

Sources
 

Ancient Roman family trees
-
-